The Binding of Isaac: Rebirth is an indie roguelike video game designed by Edmund McMillen and developed and published by Nicalis. Rebirth was released for Linux, Microsoft Windows, OS X, PlayStation 4 and PlayStation Vita in November 2014, for Xbox One, New Nintendo 3DS and Wii U in July 2015, for iOS in January 2017 and for Nintendo Switch in March 2017. The PlayStation 5 and Xbox Series X/S versions were released in November 2021.

Rebirth is a remake of The Binding of Isaac, which was developed by McMillen and Florian Himsl and released in 2011 as an Adobe Flash application. This platform had limitations and led McMillen to work with Nicalis to produce Rebirth with a more advanced game engine, which in turn enabled the substantial addition of new content and gameplay features. Three expansions have been released. Afterbirth and Afterbirth+, in October 2015 and January 2017, respectively, with more game content and gameplay modes; Afterbirth+ also added support for user-created content. The third and final expansion, Repentance, was released in March 2021.

Similar to the original Binding of Isaac, the plot is based on the biblical story of the same name and was inspired by McMillen's religious upbringing. The player controls the eponymous Isaac, a young boy whose mother, convinced that she is doing God's work, strips him of everything and locks him in his room. When Isaac's mother is about to sacrifice him, he escapes to the basement and fights through random, roguelike dungeons. The player defeats monsters, using Isaac's tears as projectiles, and collects items which modify his appearance, attributes, and abilities, potentially creating powerful combinations. Unlike the game's predecessor, Rebirth has a limited multiplayer mode, allowing an additional player in Rebirth, later increased to three additional players in Afterbirth and Afterbirth+. Full co-op support was added to Repentance, where up to four players are able to play as any of the playable characters.

Rebirth released to critical acclaim. Reviewers praised its gameplay and improvements compared to the original Binding of Isaac, but criticized its graphic imagery. Afterbirth, Afterbirth+ and Repentance also had a generally-favorable reception, with reviewers criticizing their difficulty but praising their added content. Tools for modding Afterbirth+ were criticized by users. By July 2015, Rebirth and The Binding of Isaac had sold over five million copies combined. The game is widely regarded as one of the best roguelike games of all time.

Gameplay 

The Binding of Isaac: Rebirth (like the original) is a top-down 2D game where the player controls the character Isaac, alongside sixteen other unlockable characters, as he traverses the basement and other places, fighting off monsters and collecting items. The gameplay is presented in a roguelike style; the dungeon levels are procedurally generated through a randomly generated seed into a number of self-contained rooms, including at least one boss battle. Like most roguelike games, it has permadeath; when the chosen character dies from too much damage, the game is over. Rebirth allows a play-through to be saved at any point. Map seeds can be shared, allowing for multiple people to try the same dungeon layout. However, seeded runs can’t earn player’s achievements, preventing users using overpowered seeds to get unlocks.

The game is controlled similarly to a multidirectional shooter. The player moves their character around the screen, shooting their tears in other directions; the tears are bullets which defeat enemies. The player-character's health is tracked by a number of hearts. The character can find items which replenish hearts; other items give the character additional hearts, extending their health. Throughout the dungeons, the player will find bombs to damage foes and destroy obstacles; keys to open doors and treasure chests; and coins to buy items. Many items impact the character's attributes (such as speed and the damage and range of their tears) and other gameplay effects, including a character who floats behind the player-character and aids in combat. Some items are passive; some are active and reusable (requiring the player to wait a number of rooms before they can reuse them), and others are single-use items which then disappear. The player can collect any number of passive items, whose effects build on previous ones (creating potentially powerful combinations). A player can only carry one reusable item or one single-use item, replacing it with another if found. Other rooms in the dungeons include special challenges, mini-boss fights, dice pip rooms, arcades, vaults, and curse rooms.

In addition to expanding The Binding of Isaac number of items, monsters, and room types (including those spanning multiple screens), Rebirth provides integrated controller support and allows a second local player to join in with a drop-in-drop-out mechanic. The second player controls a follower of the first player-character with the same attributes and abilities of that character, costing the first player-character one heart. The second character cannot plant bombs or carry items.

Plot 

The Binding of Isaac: Rebirth plot follows the biblical story of the same name, similar to the original game. Isaac, a child, and his mother live in a small house on a hill, both happily keeping to themselves, with Isaac drawing pictures and playing with his toys, and his mother watching Christian broadcasts on television. Isaac's mother then hears "a voice from above", stating her son is corrupted with sin, and needs to be saved. She removes all his possessions (including toys and clothing), believing they were the corrupting agents, and later locks him in his room to protect him from the evil outside. When she receives instructions to sacrifice her son to prove her devotion to her faith, Isaac flees through a trap door in his room, leading to "the unknown depths below".

After venturing through various floors and reaching The Depths, Isaac battles his mother. After defeating her, the game cuts back to Isaac in his room, where his mother attempts to kill him, grasping a butcher's knife. A Bible is knocked off a shelf, striking Isaac's mother in the head, killing her. Isaac celebrates, before the game cuts again to a smiling Isaac, where his mother once again opens his door, holding a knife.

Further completions of the game unlock new routes as well as new endings, including fights various new final bosses, such as Mom's Heart, It Lives, or Mega Satan.

The Binding of Isaac: Afterbirth 
The Binding of Isaac: Afterbirth expansion contains two new endings, both of which involve the expansion's new content. Ending 17 is unlocked by defeating the newly added boss, Hush. It opens with the missing poster from Ending 15 and zooms in on Isaac's house. The scene cuts to Isaac's mother opening his toy chest, revealing Isaac's skeletal remains. Isaac is seen in a dull-colored landscape, where a shadow forms behind him.

Ending 18 is unlocked by defeating the boss Ultra Greed at the end of the new Greed Mode. It shows Isaac in a small cave, which caves in on him. The scene then changes to show one of the shopkeepers found throughout the game. It smiles, and the scene ends.

The Binding of Isaac: Afterbirth+ 
The Binding of Isaac: Afterbirth+, like the expansion before it, contains 2 new endings involving the new content added in the expansion. Ending 19 is unlocked by defeating the boss Ultra Greedier at the end of the new Greedier mode. It is almost exactly the same as Ending 18, with the major difference being that after the shopkeeper smiles, its head falls off and the body begins to spew out a geyser of spiders. 

Ending 20, called "Final Ending" prior to The Binding of Isaac: Repentance, is unlocked after defeating the boss Delirium, who is Isaac's representation of the "light at the end of the tunnel". It builds upon events seen in Endings 12, 15, and 17, and shows Isaac recalling his memories in his final moments before dying. Isaac is shown lying in his toy chest, breathing heavily. He recalls a memory of him overhearing a fight between his parents while he is drawing, and looks at a drawing he made of his house, with the caption "WE LIVED HERE". He then recalls a memory of his mother crying in front of a TV. His breathing gets faster as he recalls another memory, this one of him looking at a burnt family photo with his father removed. His breathing slows down, with Isaac visibly turning blue. Another memory is then shown, showing a wall covered in drawings Isaac made. As the scene pans to the left, the drawings get more disturbed, and the noises of an argument in the background becomes more audible, culminating in a drawing of a demon towering over Isaac's dead and bloody parents, and Isaac's father saying "I'm outta here!" 

After a cut to black, the scene changes to Isaac's skeleton lying in the chest, covered in cobwebs. The chest is opened like in Ending 12, and the missing poster from Ending 15 is shown flying off the telephone pole. Isaac is then seen roaming the dull-colored landscape from Ending 17.

The Binding of Isaac: Repentance 

The Binding of Isaac: Repentance contains two new endings involving the new content added. Ending 21 is unlocked for defeating the newly added Mother boss. It shows Isaac drawing a picture of the boss. His mother walks in, and Isaac tries to hide the drawing from her. His mother reacts by throwing him into a closet, saying "You think I'm a monster, Isaac? I'll show you a monster!" The scene cuts to Isaac in the closet, hyperventilating. His mother then begins to tearfuly recite the Lord's Prayer, with the closet growing darker and darker. A statue of Satan materializes behind Isaac, and the scene ends.

Ending 22 is the Final Ending, and is unlocked by defeating The Beast, the true final boss of the game. This ending completes the story of the game and its expansions.

Normally, after defeating the Mom boss on Depths II (or its equivalent alternate floor), the player is locked out of leaving the room. If the player brings an item to teleport out of the room, they can enter a special door. Isaac finds a note left from his dad, and the game begins the Ascent sequence. Isaac begins to go up through the floors he visited throughout the game in reverse order.

Arguments can be heard that explain what happened to Isaac's family prior to the game. Isaac, a child, lives with his parents in a small house, on a hill. His parents become unhappy with each other, commonly fighting late at night while Isaac watches from a crack in the living room door. Isaac's father starts stealing money from his mother, who slowly develops into a religious fanatic to cope with her domestic abuse, prompting Isaac's father to leave and divorce Isaac's mother. Without Isaac's father around, her mental health worsens as she begins watching Christian broadcasts on the television, which in turn causes her to abuse Isaac.

Isaac throws himself into his toy chest from Ending 12 to hide from both his mother and himself, believing he is the reason his parents fought. The chest locks, preventing Isaac from leaving. Isaac slowly suffocates to death, with the events of the game being his final delusions. His mother realizes Isaac has gone missing, and puts up missing posters around the neighborhood in an attempt to find him, but no word comes. After an indeterminate amount of time, she opens the locked chest Isaac was in. Seeing that her son is dead, she cries over his body, mourning him.

In-game, upon venturing back from the depths of the basement to the surface, Isaac finds himself in a memory of his house. He sleeps in his mother's bed, and is awoken by a nightmare. Isaac enters the living room, where he fights Dogma, an embodiment of the Christian broadcasts watched by his mother. After defeating Dogma, Isaac fights the Four Horsemen of the Apocalypse, followed by The Beast (who is wearing his mother's dress), the true final boss of the game.

Isaac then finally ascends up to the sky, and his life flashes back before him once more, before he sees nothing. In a final hallucination, Isaac's dad interjects, asking if Isaac really wants the story to end like this, and changes it to have a happy ending, with the opening narration changed to "Isaac and his parents lived in a small house, on the top of a hill...". Isaac finally passes as the scene fades to black.

Development 

The Binding of Isaac was developed by Edmund McMillen and Florian Himsl in 2011 during a game jam after the completion of Super Meat Boy, McMillen's previous game. Since Super Meat Boy was successful, McMillen was not concerned about making a popular game; he wanted to craft a game which melded The Legend of Zelda's top-down dungeon approach with the roguelike genre, wrapping it in religious allegory inspired by his upbringing. They used Adobe Flash, since it enabled them to develop the game quickly. McMillen quietly released the game to Steam for PC, where it unexpectedly became very popular. Wanting to expand the game, McMillen and Himsl discovered limitations in Flash which made an expansion difficult. Although they could incorporate more content with the Wrath of the Lamb expansion, McMillen had to abandon a second expansion due to the limitations.

After The Binding of Isaac release, McMillen was approached by Tyrone Rodriguez of Nicalis (a development and publishing studio which had helped bring the PC games Cave Story and VVVVVV to consoles). Rodriguez offered Nicalis' services to help port The Binding of Isaac to consoles. McMillen was interested, but required they recreate the game outside Flash to incorporate the additional content he had to forego and fix additional bugs found since release. He also asked to be left out of the business side of the game's release (after his negative experiences dealing with business matters with Super Meat Boy), and Rodriguez agreed. Rebirth was announced in November 2012 as a console version of The Binding of Isaac, with plans to improve its graphics to 16-bit colors and incorporate the new content and material originally planned for the second expansion. Local cooperative play would also be added to the game, but McMillen said that they could not add online cooperative play because it would drastically lengthen development time.

McMillen wanted to overhaul the entire game, particularly its graphics (which he called an "eyesore"). After polling players about which art style to use for the remake, McMillen and Nicalis brought in artists to improve the original assets in the new style and began working on the new content. McMillen commissioned a new soundtrack for the remake from Matthias Bossi and Jon Evans.

Release 
McMillen and Rodriguez initially wanted to develop The Binding of Isaac: Rebirth for the Nintendo 3DS as a tribute to its roots in Nintendo's Legend of Zelda series. Nintendo, however, did not authorize the game's release for the 3DS in 2012 for content reasons. Although they had spent some time creating the 3DS version, McMillen and Rodriguez decided to focus on PC and PlayStation versions instead; those platforms allowed them to increase the game's capabilities. In addition to the PlayStation 3 and Vita consoles, Nicalis was in discussions with Microsoft for a release on the Xbox systems and McMillen had also considered a future iOS release. McMillen and Nicalis opted to move development from the PlayStation 3 to the new PlayStation 4 in August 2013, announcing its release at Sony's Gamescom presentation. The PlayStation 4 and Vita versions were released with the PC versions on November 4, 2014.

During development, three senior Nintendo employees—Steve Singer, vice president of licensing; Mark Griffin, a senior manager in licensing, and indie development head Dan Adelman—championed the game within the company. They continued to work within Nintendo, and secured approval of Rebirth release for the 3DS and Wii U in 2014. McMillen and Nicalis, after tailoring the game to run on more powerful systems, worked to keep it intact for the 3DS port. They spent about a year on the conversion and, although they got the game to work on the original 3DS, its performance was sub-optimal. They were one of the first developers (with Nintendo help) to obtain a development kit for the New Nintendo 3DS, which had more powerful hardware and memory to run the game at a speed matching that of the other platforms. The announcement of the New 3DS and Wii U versions was made with plans for an Xbox One version, and the game was released for all three systems on July 23, 2015.

In January 2016, Nicalis reported that it was working on an iOS port of the game. The company reported the following month that Apple rejected its application to Apple's app, citing "violence towards children" violating content policies. Nicalis has worked with Apple to obtain preapproval and will release a universal iOS version of Rebirth (including the Afterbirth+ expansion) with improvements for that platform, including the use of iCloud for ease of play on multiple devices. Although Nicalis wants to add this to the Vita port, the company said it was a low priority due to the Vita's limited ability to handle many weapon combos. The initial iOS version of the core game, without expansions, was released on January 11, 2017.

After hinting at a release on the upcoming Nintendo Switch console, Nicalis confirmed in January 2017 that Rebirth (with both expansions) would be released for the Switch in March 2017 as retail and digital titles. Scheduled for release on March 3 as a launch title, last-minute adjustments required the company to delay it until March 17. Because of the existing relationship with Nintendo for the Wii U and New Nintendo 3DS versions, Rodriguez said that they could obtain developer-prototype hardware for the Switch to port the game to that system. McMillen said that they could get Rebirth working on the Switch easily due to their approach to developing the game (with hooking integrated into respective system features, such as achievements, to simplify porting) and the ease of the Switch's development platform. The game was released for Switch on March 17, 2017. The version allows up to four players in a drop-in/drop-out cooperative mode, with the other three players using Joy-Con to control one of Isaac's "buddies" (similar to the two-player cooperative mode for PC). The physical version of the Switch game includes a manual similar to the manual which shipped with The Legend of Zelda for the Nintendo Entertainment System.

Expansions

Afterbirth 
McMillen announced The Binding of Isaac: Afterbirth, the first expansion for Rebirth, in February 2015. Afterbirth added items, enemies, alternate floors and bosses, and endings (including Greed Mode, which differs from the main game and is reportedly more difficult). Afterbirth was released on October 30, 2015, for Windows, OS X, and Linux computers. The expansion was released for the PlayStation 4 and Xbox One versions on May 10, 2016. The expansion is unlikely to be released on any other platforms due to limitations in the platforms' hardware capabilities and Afterbirth more complex mechanics.

McMillen had programmed a number of hidden secrets into The Binding of Isaac (which fans were discovering and discussing on a Reddit subforum), and took additional care to hide them in patches and updates. He knew that players would be looking for hidden secrets in Rebirth, and took steps to completely hide the Lost (a new playable character). Unlocking it required a number of steps (including having the player-character repeatedly die in specific circumstances), and hints for what needed to be done were scattered among the game's assets; therefore, McMillen and his team anticipated that it would take a long time before players would discover the Lost. However, players on the Reddit subforum went to its executable files to search for clues to secrets and discovered the Lost (and how to unlock it) within 109 hours of the game's release. McMillen said that he was disappointed with the community because his team hid the secrets for discovery in gameplay and clues in the game; although he still planned to release Afterbirth, he said that he would not rush its release.

McMillen wanted to hide the Keeper (another character) and elements already hinted at in the game about Isaac's father in Afterbirth, but knew that players would data-mine its program files to find them; instead, he planned an alternate reality game (ARG) which would require players to discover real-world clues. Since he expected the birth of his daughter at the end of September 2015 and the expansion was planned for release in October, he arranged the ARG to continue without him. When Afterbirth was released, players found what they thought were bugs (such as missing new items which had been promised on the game's store page); some accused McMillen of deceiving them. Although some of these omissions were planned as part of the ARG, McMillen discovered that the released game accidentally lacked some new items because it used a different build than originally planned. His team raced to patch the game and tried to provide support (and hints) about the Keeper, using the number 109. McMillen later said that the items missing from the released game distracted players from the secrets he had hidden.

With the release of the patch, players began discovering in-game hints about the Keeper and engaged in McMillen's ARG as planned. Clues included calling a special phone number and identifying actual locations in the Santa Cruz area (where McMillen lives) which were related to the game. Following additional clues (including locating a buried figure of one of the game's mini-bosses), they unlocked the Keeper and additional in-game items to collect. Although McMillen thought that the ARG ultimately worked out, he would not engage the community in a similar manner again to avoid seeming egotistical.

Afterbirth+ 
Nicalis announced in December 2015 that a second expansion, Afterbirth+, was in development. In addition to adding monsters, bosses, items and a playable character called Apollyon to the game, the expansion includes a bestiary which tracks how many of each type of creature (and boss) the player has defeated and modding support to allow players to craft room types, import graphics, and script events with Lua. The expansion was released for Windows on January 3, 2017, and for PlayStation 4 on September 19, 2017. The expansion later released to Xbox One as downloadable content on October 24, 2019. The Switch version of the game was released in North America on March 17, 2017, and in Europe and Australasia on September 7 of that year. This version includes Afterbirth and Afterbirth+; limited-time launch editions of the game are available physically and digitally, making it the first Nicalis-published game to be released physically.

Some of the best community mods were added to the game in "booster packs" (initially planned monthly, becoming less frequent), with the first release in March 2017 and the fifth (and final) release on May 1, 2018. The last two packs include material developed by players who created the Antibirth fan expansion and whom McMillen enlisted.

Repentance 
Before the release of Afterbirth+, The Binding of Isaac: Antibirth (a fan-made mod of Rebirth) was released in December 2016. Similar to the official expansions, Antibirth adds playable characters, bosses, power-ups and other content, and returns some gameplay aspects (which had been changed in the Afterbirth expansion) to the original Rebirth version. Alice O'Connor of Rock, Paper, Shotgun called the mod "more difficult than [The Binding of Isaac]" and a new challenge compatible with the official game expansions. At McMillen's request, the group reworked some Antibirth content (which was incorporated into the Afterbirth+ booster packs). McMillen said at PAX West in September 2018 that Antibirth would be made into Repentance (official DLC for Rebirth), and he was working with some of the mod's creators on balance tweaking and ensuring that its narrative was consistent with Isaac. Initially, Repentance was announced to be a reworking of the extremely well-regarded Antibirth mod for The Binding of Isaac (it's being developed alongside Antibirth's original creator Vinh), albeit tweaked to "make it canon" and expanded with "a ton more content".

The expansion was released for PC on March 31, 2021. Repentance was released for Nintendo Switch, PlayStation 4, PlayStation 5, Xbox One, and Xbox Series X/S on November 4, 2021.

Future development 
Although McMillen wanted to support the modding community and its expansions as part of The Binding of Isaac: Rebirth, he found that several ideas began overlapping with his own thoughts about what a sequel to The Binding of Isaac should be; in addition, further expansion of the game would require him to rework the base game engine. With the last booster packs (containing Antibirth content), he considered The Binding of Isaac complete. The addition of the Antibirth content somewhat extends the game, but McMillen does not plan anymore updates. He plans to continue to develop The Binding of Isaac franchise; a prequel, The Legend of Bum-bo, was released on November 12, 2019. During an investigation by Kotaku exploring questionable business practices and behavior from Nicalis, McMillen announced that he would be severing his working relationship with the company, with Repentance being their final planned collaboration.

Reception 

According to review aggregator Metacritic, The Binding of Isaac: Rebirth received "generally favorable" reviews; the iOS version received "universal acclaim". Dan Stapleton of IGN praised Rebirth for the seemingly-endless variation in gameplay created by each run-through, giving him "plenty of motivation" to continue playing; his only criticism was its lack of in-game information on available power-ups. GameSpots Brent Todd wrote that while the game's story and imagery may be initially disturbing, Rebirth has "speedy, varied gameplay and seemingly neverending new features" which would keep the player entertained for a long time. Simon Parkin of Eurogamer said that Rebirth "feels like the product of the psychotherapeutic process", but is "the most accessible Rogue-like [game] yet made" due to its easy control scheme and randomization of each run. Nic Rowen of Destructoid said that Rebirth was a great improvement on The Binding of Isaac, "an incredible experience that can't be missed".

Afterbirth+ received generally-favorable reviews from critics. Jose Otero of IGN praised its variety: "The unpredictable items and varied enemies make it one of the most wacky and replayable games I've ever experienced." Although Peter Glagowksi of Destructoid gave its DLC a positive review, calling it an "impressive effort", he wrote that the DLC's base content has little to offer newcomers to the series.

Rock, Paper, Shotgun was critical of the DLC's difficulty, which it thought was largely derived from random, untelegraphed enemy behavior. About Afterbirth+ design cohesion, reviewer Adam Smith characterized its DLC as "mashing together existing parts of the game and producing either a weak cover version or a clumsy remix". Review website Beastby criticized of Afterbirth+ fairness: "The question isn't always 'Will I enjoy the gameplay loop?' but rather 'How many unfair runs will it take for me to have one in which I stand a chance? The expansion's modding application programming interface was called "a disappointment" by members of the Team Alpha modding group, who expressed frustration with the API's "massive shortcomings" and Nicalis' lack of support.

Notes

References

External links 

 

2014 video games
Child abuse in fiction
Cooperative video games
Criticism of Christianity
Four Horsemen of the Apocalypse in popular culture
IOS games
Linux games
Multiplayer and single-player video games
Nicalis games
New Nintendo 3DS games
Nintendo 3DS eShop games
Nintendo Switch games
MacOS games
PlayStation 4 games
PlayStation 5 games
PlayStation Network games
PlayStation Vita games
Roguelike video games
Seven deadly sins in popular culture
Video game remakes
Video games about children
Video games about religion
Video games based on mythology
Video games developed in the United States
Video games using procedural generation
Video games with downloadable content
Video games with expansion packs
Wii U eShop games
Windows games
Xbox One games
Xbox Series X and Series S games
Video games designed by Edmund McMillen